John Laird (1811–1896) was a Scottish minister of the Free Church of Scotland who served as Moderator of the General Assembly to the Free Church 1889/90.

Life

He was born in the manse at Portmoak on the banks of Loch Leven, the son of Hugh Laird (d.1849). His father was minister of the parish from 1802 to 1843 and the Free Chuch minister until his death in 1849.

He studied divinity at the University of Edinburgh and was ordained by the Church of Scotland at Arbroath in 1835. He was translated to Inverkeilor in 1836. He left the established church in the Disruption of 1843 and joined the Free Church of Scotland. In 1847 he became minister of the Free St George's Church in Montrose. In 1853 he translated to the Free Church in Cupar, replacing Adam Cairns.

In 1870 he organised the rebuilding of the Free Church in Cupar. This was designed by Campbell Douglas and occupied from 1875 but the huge spire was not completed until 1879. In May 1881, J. T. Ferguson of Glasgow was appointed his colleague and successor.

In 1889 he was elected Moderator of the General Assembly. He was succeeded in 1890 by Thomas Brown.

He died in 1896.

Works
Hearing  the  Word,  a  sermon
Sermon  on  the  Death  of  Captain  A. O. Dalgleish,  Cupar-Fife
Sermon  LXI.  (Free Church  Pulpit,  ii.,  89)
Sermons  [Memorial Sketch (portrait  by  his  son  David)]  (Edinburgh, 1897). —
Presb.  Review,  viii.

Family

He  married 5 November 1840, Agnes  Maule  (born  11  May  1822,  died 11 December  1887), daughter of Thomas Anderson, farmer,  Westhaven,  Carnoustie,  and  Jean Sim,  and had issue  —
Hugh  Alexander, merchant,  Rangoon,  Burma,  born  1  December 1841,  died  21 August 1911
Jane  Catherine, born  10 February 1843, died  31 May 1873
John George,  mercantile  clerk,  born  21 November 1848,  died  12 August 1867
Henry James,  merchant,  London,  born  27 June 1853
David  Michael  William,  born  1 April  1856,  minister  of  the  Free  Church, Durris,  Kincardineshire,  1884-1904,  died in  Edinburgh,  March  1924
Alexander Anderson,  banker,  London,  born 8 October 1859, died 22 July 1922.

John's grandson, by his son D. M. W. Laird was the philosopher John Laird.

Two of his brothers, Alexander Oswald Laird of Dundee, and Henry Laird of Leslie, Fife were Free Church ministers. Two of his sisters married Free Church ministers: Rev Spiers of Kinglassie and Rev James Swinton of Portmoak (his father's successor).

References

Citations

Sources

1811 births
1896 deaths
Alumni of the University of Edinburgh
19th-century Ministers of the Free Church of Scotland